Ernest Liberati (22 March 1906 – 2 June 1983) was a French footballer (of Italian ancestry). He played as a forward. He was part of the France national football team at the FIFA World Cup 1930.

External links
 

1906 births
1983 deaths
Footballers from Oran
People of French Algeria
Pieds-Noirs
French people of Italian descent
French footballers
France international footballers
Association football forwards
Amiens SC players
FC Sochaux-Montbéliard players
Valenciennes FC players
Olympique de Marseille players
Ligue 1 players
Ligue 2 players
1930 FIFA World Cup players
SC Fives players
Olympique Lillois players